Luther Pfahler Eisenhart (13 January 1876 – 28 October 1965) was an American mathematician, best known today for his contributions to semi-Riemannian geometry.

Life

Eisenhart was born in York, Pennsylvania, and graduated from Gettysburg College in 1896. He earned his doctorate in 1900 at Johns Hopkins University, where he was influenced (at long range) by the work of Gaston Darboux and at shorter range by that of Thomas Craig. During the next two decades, Eisenhart's research focused on moving frames after the French school, but around 1921 took a different turn when he became enamored of the mathematical challenges and entrancing beauty of a new theory of gravitation, Albert Einstein's general theory of relativity.

Eisenhart played a central role in American mathematics in the early twentieth century. He served as chairman of the mathematics department at Princeton University and later as Dean of the Graduate School there from 1933 to 1945. He is widely credited with guiding the development in America of the mathematical background needed for the further development of general relativity, through his influential textbooks and his personal interaction with Albert Einstein, Oswald Veblen, and John von Neumann at the nearby Institute for Advanced Study, as well as with gifted students such as Abraham Haskel Taub.

In the early 40s he chaired the "Reference Committee", formed in June 1940 for editors of scientific journals to send the papers submitted to them, in order to check that the papers did not contain results (especially regarding nuclear physics) whose public knowledge could be detrimental to the US war efforts.

Publications

Notes

External links

 
 
National Academy of Sciences Biographical Memoir

1876 births
1965 deaths
People from York, Pennsylvania
Differential geometers
20th-century American mathematicians
Gettysburg College alumni
Princeton University faculty
Presidents of the American Mathematical Society
Johns Hopkins University alumni
Mathematicians from Pennsylvania